Orania ravaka is a species of flowering plant in the family Arecaceae.

Range and habitat
Orania ravaka found only in northeastern Madagascar, around Antongil Bay, including the western Masoala Peninsula and the lowlands to the west and north. It is known from six locations. Its habitat is  lowland rainforest, including ridge tops and valley bottoms, between 100 and 900 meters elevation.

The species is threatened with habitat loss from shifting cultivation and logging.

References

External links
Photo of Orania ravaka at the Palm and Cycad Societies of Australia website
Photo of sprouting seeds from the University of British Columbia Botanical Garden & Centre for Plant Research

ravaka
Plants described in 1995
Endemic flora of Madagascar
Flora of the Madagascar lowland forests
Vulnerable plants
Taxonomy articles created by Polbot
Taxa named by Henk Jaap Beentje